P. K. Reghukumar (Raghukumar; 13 June 1953 – 20 February 2014) was a noted music composer from Kerala, India. His compositions first achieved prominence in the 1980s.

Life and work
Born into the prominent Pootheri family at Kozhikode in Kerala on 13 June 1953, Raghukumar started training in Indian classical music with Carnatic vocals at an early age under the tutelage of Guru G.S.Sreekrishnan. Subsequently, he took training in Indian percussion on the tabla under the able guidance of Guru Balasubramaniam of (All India Radio). Fascinated by Hindustani music, Raghukumar started training on the sitar under Guru Vincent (a.k.a. Vincent Master).

At the age of 15, Raghukumar debuted on stage as an accompanying artist for eminent musicians of Indian classical and Western percussion from all over India. At the age of 16, he was a graded percussionist for All India Radio. He then graduated to grade 'A' music composer for All India Radio. He made an entry into the film industry as a musician under the guidance of the eminent music arranger/composer R. K. Shekhar (Father of A.R.Rahman).

Raghukumar was married to the actress Bhavani. The couple have two daughters : Bhavana and Bhavitha.

Raghukumar died at the age of 60 on 20 February 2014, due to kidney failure. He was survived by his wife, children and siblings, Prasanna and Vijayakumar.

Famous hits 
Thalavattam
Hello My Dear Wrong Number
Shyama (film)
Boeing Boeing
Maya Mayuram
Kanakkinavu
Aryan (1988 film)
Dheera
Collector (2011 film)
Subhadram
Cheppu
Onnanamkunnul Oradikunnil
Aram + Aram = Kinnaram
Ayiram Kannukal
Ithramathram
Veendum Lisa

Discography

Films 
 Visham
Onnanam Kunnil Oradi Kunnil
Aram + Aram = Kinnaram
 Ponthooval
 Onnum Mindatha Bharya
 Nathi Muthal Nathi Vare
Veendum Lisa
Ithra Mathram
 Paavam Poornima
 Hello My Dear Wrong Number
 Cheppu
 Aryan
 Ayiram Kannukal
 Manasariyathe
Amina Tailors
 Kottum Kuravayum
 Aattakatha
Kaanaakinaavu
 Maya Mayuram
 Shyama
 Pauran
 Subadram
 Eswara Jagadeeshwara
 Manasille Manpeda
 Thalavattam
 Boeing Boeing
Dheera (1982)
 Collector

Albums 
 Gaana Pournami (1985) (HMV)
 Chingappulari (1985) (Sootti Cassettes)
 Sweet Melodies Vol-3 (1987) (Tharangini)
 Athappoo (1988) (CBS)
 Thulasi Mala Vol-2 (1995) (Tharangini)
 Ponnona Tharangini Vol-4 (1995) (Tharangini)
 Hari Narayana (1995) (Magnasound)
 Swami Paadam (1996) (Sarangi Music)
 Chithira Thumbi (1997) (Audiotracs)
 Aarathi (2000) (Jubilee Audios)
 Varumo Vasantham (2008) (Sathyam Audios)
 Chithra Vasantham (Audiotracs)
 Pathinettam Padi (Pyramid)
 Kaanipponu
 Harinamakkili
 Sarana Yathra
 Pushpolsavam
 Pranaya Swarangal

References

External links 
 
 Facebook Page

2014 deaths
1953 births
Musicians from Kozhikode
Malayalam film score composers
20th-century Indian composers
Film musicians from Kerala
Indian male composers
21st-century Indian composers
Male film score composers
20th-century male musicians
21st-century male musicians